Mississippi Highway 363 (MS 363) is a state highway in Itawamba and Lee counties in northeastern Mississippi.

Route description
The highway's southern terminus is at MS 178, however some signage for MS 363 appears west along MS 178 to its interchange with Interstate 22/U.S. Route 78 (I-22/US 78). MS 363 heads north and northwest towards Mantachie. In the center of town, it intersects MS 371. Continuing its course northwest and north, the highway passes a few businesses near the town center but its surroundings becomes more rural with some open fields and houses lining the road. At Centerville, MS 363 exits the town limits of Mantachie, briefly curves towards the west, then resumes a northwest heading. At the community of Ratliff, the highway curves to the west again and enters Lee County. In Lee County, the surroundings turn to more woods. It has an interchange with the Natchez Trace Parkway (a pair of quadrant interchanges) and then enters Saltillo. In the western part of the city, MS 363 is known as Mobile Street and passes through a residential neighborhood. Upon crossing a railroad, it heads west through the central business district of Saltillo. At 3rd Avenue, MS 366 meets MS 766 at its southern terminus. Past there, the highway heads through another residential neighborhood before curving to the north, curving back to the west, and ending at MS 145.

History
The portion of highway from Peppertown to Mantachie had been part of the state highway since at least 1928. Around 1950, the designation of MS 363 was assigned on this highway from US 78 at Peppertown to Mantachie and then further north along modern-day MS 371 to MS 4 at Hobo Station, Prentiss County. A state highway, initially designated MS 371, connecting Mantachie with Saltillo was created in 1956. Around 1965, MS 363 and MS 371 swapped alignments north of Mantachie with MS 363 heading west to Saltillo at US 45 and MS 371 heading north to MS 4. MS 363 has not had any major changes since then.

Major intersections

References

External links

363
Transportation in Itawamba County, Mississippi
Transportation in Lee County, Mississippi